Musella is an unincorporated community and census-designated place (CDP) in Crawford County, Georgia, United States.

It first appeared as a CDP in the 2020 Census with a population of 104.

History
A post office called Musella was established in 1889. According to tradition, the community's name is an amalgamation Mose and Ella, the names of two first settlers. It is located in Crawford County Georgia, and is home to a mere 1,291 residents. At its heart, the very popular Dickies peach packing shed, famous for its creamy peach ice creme, made from the fresh local peaches. Next door, C.F. Hays & Son general store, a small and traditional country store; built in the year 1900. It's home to a wide variety of small shops in the summer, including Roberts BBQ, Timmie's vegetable stand, and Davids Gems. All year-round, it is a pleasant place to be, and if you're lucky enough, you might find Buddy Hays working on his 36 Ford in the shop across the street.

Demographics

2020 census

Note: the US Census treats Hispanic/Latino as an ethnic category. This table excludes Latinos from the racial categories and assigns them to a separate category. Hispanics/Latinos can be of any race.

References

Unincorporated communities in Crawford County, Georgia
Census-designated places in Crawford County, Georgia
Macon metropolitan area, Georgia